Congregation Sharey Tzedek Synagogue (שערי צדק) is a historic Jewish synagogue at 833 South 200 East in Salt Lake City, Utah, United States.

History
A group of mostly of Yiddish-speaking immigrants from Russia and elsewhere in Eastern Europe split off from Congregation Montefiore in 1916 to form Congregation Sharey Tzedek, Utah's third Jewish congregation. The group raised $33,200 to buy the land and build a synagogue. The building was built by general contractor John E. Anderson, and it was completed in 1920. Utah Governor Simon Bamberger spoke at the dedication on March 28, 1920. When the synagogue was built, its front had circular windows that contained colored glass with a star of David. Rabbi Joseph Strinkomsky served as the congregation's first rabbi. Services were in line with Orthodox Judaism, with different seating areas for men and women. Most of the members lived within a short walk of the synagogue, and they shopped at a kosher butcher nearby.

The congregation disbanded in the 1930s, and the building was sold to the Veterans of Foreign Wars in 1948. At the time of the building's sale, many of the original members of the congregation had died, and others were attending religious services at B'nai Israel, which followed Reform Judaism, or at Montefiore Synagogue, which followed Conservative Judaism.

A new Veterans of Foreign Wars post, led by Guy Snyder and Post Commander Lloyd S. Grover, began using the building.

The building was added to the National Register of Historic Places in 1985.

According to the Utah Historical Society, the building is significant "for its historical association with Utah's pluralistic community."

See also

B'nai Israel Temple - Synagogue belonging to the first Jewish congregation in the Salt Lake City area.
Congregation Montefiore Synagogue - Synagogue belonging to the second Jewish congregation in the Salt Lake City area.

References

External links

Ashkenazi Jewish culture in the United States
European American culture in Utah
National Register of Historic Places in Salt Lake City
Synagogues completed in 1920
Romanesque Revival architecture in Utah
Russian-Jewish culture in the United States
Synagogues in Salt Lake City
Synagogues on the National Register of Historic Places in Utah